Odesza (stylized as ODESZA) is an American electronic music duo originating from Bellingham, Washington. It consists of Harrison Mills and Clayton Knight, known individually as Catacombkid and BeachesBeaches. They formed in 2012, shortly before Mills and Knight graduated from Western Washington University.

Their debut album, Summer's Gone, was released later in 2012 to acclaim in the underground electronic music community. After their debut extended play (EP), My Friends Never Die, in 2013, they released their second album, In Return, on September 9, 2014. It was the duo's debut release on Ninja Tune and its imprint, Counter Records. In 2016, "Say My Name" (RAC mix) gained the duo their first Grammy nomination (Best Remixed Recording, Non-Classical) at the 58th Annual Grammy Awards. A Moment Apart, their third studio album, was released on September 8, 2017. It reached number three on the Billboard 200, while topping the Top Electronic/Dance Albums Chart. It was nominated for Best Dance/Electronic Album, with "Line of Sight" also nominated for Best Dance Recording, at the 60th Annual Grammy Awards in 2018. ODESZA released their fourth studio album, The Last Goodbye, on July 22, 2022 on Ninja Tune. The album was nominated for Best Dance/Electronic Album for the 65th Grammy Awards.

The duo was also nominated in 2017 for Producer of the Year at the Electronic Music Awards. They have founded and operated their own record label, Foreign Family Collective, which distributes songs as well as visual art from artists. Furthermore, Billboard named Odesza as number 10 on their 2018 ranking of dance musicians, the Billboard Dance 100.

History

Early career 
Harrison Mills and Clayton Knight met during their freshman year at Western Washington University. The two did not share the same educational interests. Knight studied physics and mathematics while Mills studied graphic design. They did not begin collaborating musically until their senior year in 2012 after befriending their early influence into music, DJ Maul-IE. As a child, Knight was classically trained in piano and later learned guitar.

Name 
The band's name is taken from the name of Mills' uncle's sunken vessel, which was named after the Ukrainian city of Odesa. Only his uncle and one other crew mate survived. Since the spelling "Odessa" was already being used by a Scottish synth band, they instead chose to use a form of the Hungarian spelling, replacing the "ss" with "sz". The correct spelling in Hungarian is “Odessza”.

Individually Mills is known as Catacombkid, and Knight is known as BeachesBeaches. In reference to how Mills got his nickname, he says, "I got into Aesop Rock and he has a song called 'Catacomb Kids.' I thought it sounded cool." On the other hand, regarding the story behind Knight's nickname, Knight says, "Honestly I was high in my bedroom making music one day…"

2012–2014: Summer's Gone, My Friends Never Die EP and In Return 

The duo quickly released their debut LP, Summer's Gone, on September 5, 2012. On November 9, 2012, Odesza performed their first show, opening for Teen Daze and Beat Connection in Bellingham, WA. Odesza was booked to open for Pretty Lights on his Analog Future Tour in the fall of 2013. Their first headline tour kicked off on March 12, 2014. On October 17, 2014, Odesza's In Return North American tour sold out 28 shows. Thirty-one Odesza tracks have reached the top on Hype Machine, including "How Did I Get Here", "Memories That You Call", "Lights", "All We Need" (Autograf Remix), among others. Their first festival performance at Sasquatch! Music Festival in George, Washington was followed by slots at over 20 festivals, including Coachella, SXSW, Hangout Festival, Lightning in a Bottle, Governor's Ball Music Festival, Bonnaroo Music Festival, Firefly Music Festival, Free Press Summer Fest, and Lollapalooza.

2015–2016: Foreign Family Collective and touring 
In March 2015, Odesza launched Foreign Family Collective, an outlet for musicians and visual artists alike. Their goal is to help upcoming artists gain more exposure by releasing one-off singles. As of December 2017, there have been 29 released singles.

On November 11, 2015, Odesza launched their official mobile app on iOS and Android.

Following their sold out In Return Fall Tour, Odesza released the video for "It's Only" (featuring Zyra) on January 18, 2016.

2017: A Moment Apart and 2017 A Moment Apart Tour 
On April 25, 2017, Odesza released two digital singles, "Late Night" and "Line of Sight" featuring WYNNE and Mansionair. On June 12, 2017, the duo released two additional digital singles ("Meridian" and "Corners of the Earth" featuring RY X), and announced a September 8 release date for their third studio album, A Moment Apart. An additional single ("Higher Ground" featuring Naomi Wild) was released after having been leaked online. Following the release of the album, a world tour was announced with dates across Australia, Europe, and North America. The 2017 A Moment Apart Tour was met with great response, selling out large venues such as Staples Center and Barclays Center.

Tracks from A Moment Apart have been widely used across the media; "Across the Room" (featuring Leon Bridges) was used on Grey's Anatomy S14E05, "Danger Zone"; "A Moment Apart" in GoPro Hero6's commercial and as a song on a radio station in Forza Horizon 4; "Late Night" for Acura. "La Ciudad" was used as one of the background tracks to EA Sports’ FIFA 18.

On October 26, 2017, Odesza made their debut television appearance on Jimmy Kimmel Live! performing "Line of Sight" featuring WYNNE and "Higher Ground" featuring Naomi Wild. On November 28, 2017, A Moment Apart was nominated for Best Dance/Electronic Album at the 60th Annual Grammy Awards; their single "Line of Sight" featuring WYNNE & Mansionair was nominated for Best Dance Recording.

2018–2019: 2018 A Moment Apart Tour, "Loyal" and Sundara 
On December 4, 2017, Odesza announced the continuation of their A Moment Apart Tour, kicking off February 2, 2018 at Laneway Festival. On January 2, 2018, Odesza announced they would be joining the Coachella 2018 lineup, playing on Sunday night before Eminem. On January 9, "Corners of the Earth" was chosen to be used as the Winter Olympics Anthem.

On September 12, 2018, Odesza released their 11th single, “Loyal”. “Loyal” is also on A Moment Apart (Delxue Edition). It peaked at 19th on the US dance chart. “Loyal” gained more popularity when it was featured on Apple’s “Apple's Big News in 108 seconds” and "iPhone Xr" advertisements, these adverts also premiered on the same date as Loyal suggesting that Apple and ODESZA had an agreement to release the two at the same time. Additionally, "Loyal" was used in an advertisement for the Nissan Juke.

“Loyal” was also used in the release trailer for the Fortune Island expansion of the 2018 video game Forza Horizon 4.

On October 16, 2018, Foreign Family Collective announced its first Odesza-curated festival, Sundara, held at the all-inclusive Barceló Resort in Riviera Maya, Mexico. The four-day festival ran from March 13–16, and featured major acts like RL Grime, Rüfüs du Sol, Alison Wonderland, Jai Wolf, and many more.

2020: Bronson

On April 26, 2020, Odesza announced on their social media that they had completed a collaborative album with Australian producer Golden Features. On April 27, it was confirmed that both the project and the album would be titled Bronson, and that it would be released on July 17, 2020, with the first two tracks "Heart Attack" and "Vaults" available the following day.

On June 30, 2020, the third track "Dawn" was released, with the duo announcing that their album would be pushed back to August 7, 2020.

2022: The Last Goodbye
On February 2, 2022, Odesza released an Instagram clip hinting at further music. Their website was also updated to include a phone number and email entry form which when filled out, had the message "Welcome to The Last Goodbye". The cryptic nature of the clip and message lead to speculation that the group may have been breaking up, which was later quelled by Mills and Knight.

Odesza released their first new music in over four years with the release of their new single "The Last Goodbye" on February 8, 2022, which samples the vocals from Bettye LaVette's 1965 hit song "Let Me Down Easy".

In March 2022, Odesza announced that their fourth studio album was also called The Last Goodbye, and would be released on July 22, 2022. In that same month, they announced a 27-date The Last Goodbye Tour, featuring special guests San Holo, Elderbrook, Ben Böhmer, Ford., Gilligan Moss, and Nasaya. On June 8, 2022, Odesza released their fifth single, "Wide Awake", off of The Last Goodbye.

The album was nominated for Best Dance/Electronic Album for the 65th Grammy Awards.

In January 2023, Bonnaroo Music Festival announced that Odesza would headline on Saturday night, June 17, 2023.

Awards and nominations

Discography

Studio albums

Collaborative albums

Extended plays

Remix EPs

Singles

Other charted songs

Remixes

Notes

References

External links 
 

Musical groups established in 2012
Electronic dance music duos
American electronic music duos
Musical groups from Seattle
Progressive house musicians
Future bass musicians
American DJs
Ableton Live users
Counter Records artists
Ninja Tune artists
DJ duos
2012 establishments in Washington (state)